North Posey Senior High School is a public high school located in Poseyville, Indiana.  North Posey is the high school for the MSD of North Posey County, which includes Bethel, Robb, Smith, Harmony, Center and Robinson Townships in Posey County, Indiana.

North Posey was opened in 1959 after the four separate schools of Poseyville, Cynthiana, Wadesville and Griffin consolidated. In 2012, New Harmony School consolidated with North Posey.

Athletics

Teams
North Posey's athletic teams are nicknamed the Vikings and the school's colors are red and black. The Vikings compete in the Pocket Athletic Conference. North Posey competes in the following sports:

Boys Football
Girls Volleyball
Girls Softball
Boys Baseball
Boys Wrestling
Girls and Boys Basketball
Boys and Girls track & field
Boys and Girls soccer
Boys and Girls golf
Boys and Girls tennis

State championships
Baseball
2005 Indiana 2A Champions
2006 Indiana 2A Champions

Demographics
96.9% of the student population at North Posey Sr. High School identify as Caucasian, making up the majority of the student body. For the 2014/2015 school year, there were 477 students enrolled in grades 9 through 12. The student body makeup is 51% male and 49% female.

Facilities
North Posey High School has a 2,000 seat newly remodeled basketball court. There is also a second auxiliary gym, baseball and softball field, a soccer field, a football/track stadium and 5 tennis courts.

Notable alumni
John Hostettler (1979) - Former six-term Republican Representative of Indiana's 8th congressional district (1995-2007)

See also
 List of high schools in Indiana

References

External links
MSD of North Posey County

 

Public high schools in Indiana
Pocket Athletic Conference
Schools in Posey County, Indiana
High schools in Southwestern Indiana
Educational institutions established in 1959
1959 establishments in Indiana